Bernard F. Martin (February 4, 1845 – August 10, 1914) was an American politician from Manhattan, New York City.

Early years
He was born on February 4, 1845, County Longford, Ireland. The family emigrated to the United States when Bernard was four years old, in 1849. He attended the old Orange Street School and St. Francis Xavier's College. Then he became a delivery clerk. He fought for three months in the American Civil War with the 37th New York Volunteers. Returning home, he became a street car conductor, and later a driver for the New York News Company.

Career
He joined Tammany Hall at the time of John Kelly's leadership, and became a clerk in the office of the Board of Health. In 1882, he kept a saloon for a short time, and later engaged in the real estate business.

He was an Alderman of New York City in 1882; a Coroner of New York County from 1883 to 1885; a deputy Sheriff of New York County; Deputy Commissioner of Public Works of New York City from 1890 to 1891; Commissioner of Jurors in 1892; and a Police Justice from 1893 to 1895.

Martin was a member of the New York State Senate (13th D.) from 1896 to 1906, sitting in the 119th, 120th, 121st, 122nd, 123rd, 124th, 125th, 126th, 127th, 128th and 129th New York State Legislatures.

Death
He died on August 10, 1914, at his summer home in Atlantic Highlands, New Jersey, of "heart disease brought on by indigestion".

Sources

1845 births
1914 deaths
Democratic Party New York (state) state senators
People from County Longford
Politicians from County Longford
New York (state) state court judges
New York City Council members
Irish emigrants to the United States (before 1923)
Coroners of New York County, New York
Sheriffs of New York County, New York
19th-century American judges